Estácio is a neighborhood in Rio de Janeiro, Brazil.

The neighborhood was named after Estácio de Sá, the founder of Rio de Janeiro. The place where samba began.

References

Neighbourhoods in Rio de Janeiro (city)